The Professorship in Latin at University College London (UCL) is one of the original professorships at UCL.  Along with the Professorship in Greek, the chair dates back to the foundations of the university in the 1820s.  The first holder was the Rev. John Williams, "but he resigned in June, 1828, in deference to the opposition of his ecclesiastical superiors to the secular character of the university".  Williams was succeeded by T. Hewitt Key, who was a founder of University College School and served as Head Master as well as Professor.  The chair, which is a full-time position, has been occupied by a series of distinguished scholars including J. R. Seeley, Robinson Ellis, A. E. Housman, H. E. Butler, Otto Skutsch, George Goold, and Malcolm Willcock.

List of holders 
The following have held the chair of Latin:

 J. Williams, 1826-1828
 Thomas Hewitt Key, 1828-1842
 George Long, 1842-1846
 Francis William Newman, 1846-1863
 John Robert Seeley, 1863-1870
 Robinson Ellis, 1870-1876
 Alfred Goodwin, 1876-1880 (also Professor of Greek, 1879–1892)
 A. J. Church, 1880-1889
 Alfred Goodwin, 1889-1892 (second tenure)
 A. E. Housman, 1892-1911
 Harold Edgeworth Butler, 1911-1942
 Otto Skutsch, 1951-1972
 G. P. Goold, 1973-1978
 Malcolm Willcock, 1980-1991
 Gerard O'Daly, 1991-2004
 Maria Wyke, 2005–present

References

Sources 
 H. Hale Bellot, University College, London, 1826-1926, London, 1929.
R. B. Todd, ed., The Dictionary of British Classicists, 3 vols., Bristol, 2004.
 P. G. Naiditch, A. E. Housman at University College, London: the election of 1892, Leiden, 1988.
 [W. P. Ker, ed.], Notes and materials for the history of University College, London, London, 1898
 Christopher Stray, Classics Transformed: Schools, Universities, and Society in England, 1830-1960, Oxford, 1998.
 University of London Calendar

External links 
 Department of Greek and Latin at UCL

Latin, *, University College London
Latin
Latin, *, University College London